The 2020–21 UAE Pro League was the 46th edition of the UAE Pro League following the cancellation of the previous season, no team changes occurred due to the previous season declared as void in UAE football. Despite starting the season with rough results, Al Jazira went on to win their third league title while Baniyas finished second, coincidentally, both teams finished in the same positions ten years ago in the 2010–11 season.

Stadia and locations

Note: Table lists clubs in alphabetical order.

Personnel and kits 

Note: Flags indicate national team as has been defined under FIFA eligibility rules. Players may hold more than one non-FIFA nationality.

Foreign players 
All teams could register as many foreign players as they want, but could only use four on the field each game.

Players name in bold indicates the player is registered during the mid-season transfer window.
Players in italics were out of the squad or left the club within the season, after the pre-season transfer window, or in the mid-season transfer window, and at least had one appearance.

Managerial changes

League table

Results

Seasonal statistics

Positions by round

Top Scorers

As of 15 May 2021

Top Assists

As of 15 May 2021

Clean sheets

As of 15 May 2021

Hat-tricks

Notes
4 Player scored 4 goals(H) – Home team(A) – Away team

Number of teams by Emirates

References

UAE Pro League seasons
1
UAE